Southpaw is the fifth studio album by Irish singer-songwriter Gilbert O'Sullivan, originally released in November 1977. This was the first album produced by Gilbert O'Sullivan. Union Square Music re-released it in June 2012 on Salvo label in part of the Gilbert O'Sullivan - A Singer & His Songs collection.

This was the first of O'Sullivans albums not to contain a UK top 40 single. However, "I'll Believe It When I See It" and "To Each His Own" did chart in the Irish top 20.

Track listing 
All songs written by Gilbert O'Sullivan.
 "Intro" - 0:46
 "You Got Me Going" - 2:40
 "No Telling Why" - 3:36
 "Tomorrow Today" - 3:12
 "The Best Fun I Ever Had" - 3:33
 "I Remember Once" - 5:15
 "Intro 2" - 0:23
 "I Of Course Replied" - 2:42
 "That's Where I Belong" - 3:33
 "My Love and I" - 3:22
 "If I Can't Have You All To Myself" - 3:04
 "Miss My Love Today" - 3:56

Bonus tracks on the 2012 remaster
 "I'll Believe It When I See It" (single, August 1975) - 5:20
 "Just As You Are" (b-side of "I'll Believe It When I See It") - 2:38
 "You Never Listen To Reason" (single, October 1975) - 3:20
 "Call On Me" (b-side of "You Never Listen To Reason") - 3:14
 "Doing What I Know" (single, August 1976) - 4:45
 "To Each His Own" (single, October 1976) - 3:08
 "Can't Get You Out of My Mind" (b-side of "To Each His Own") - 3:24
 "As Long As I Can" (b-side of "You Got Me Going", July 1977) - 2:21
 "Our Own Baby" (b-side of "Miss My Love Today", February 1978) - 3:10

Personnel
 Gilbert O'Sullivan - vocals, piano

Additional personnel
 Chris Spedding - guitars
 Lee Fothergill - guitars
 Ritchie Cunningham - guitars
 Colin Green - guitars
 Alan Jones - bass
 Barry De Souza - drums
 Pete Kircher - drums
 Terry Cox - drums
 Tony Hymas - keyboards, Moog
 Robert Hook - keyboards, Moog
 Frank Ricotti - percussion
 Francisco Yglesias - Paraguayan Harp
 The Mike Sammes Singers, The Chanter Sisters - backing vocals
 Johnnie Spence - arranger, conductor
Technical
 John Haeny, Phil Ramone - engineers

External links 
Official Gilbert O'Sullivan page

1977 albums
Gilbert O'Sullivan albums
MAM Records albums